Habenaria, commonly called rein orchids or bog orchids, is a widely distributed genus of orchids in the tribe Orchideae. About 880 species of Habenaria have been formally described. They are native to every continent except Antarctica, growing in both tropical and subtropical zones.

Description
Plants in the genus Habenaria are mainly terrestrial plants with fleshy tubers and upright, tall, thin or fleshy stems. The leaves are either arranged in a rosette at the base of the plants or scattered up the stem. The flowers are resupinate, usually small, white, green or yellowish and arranged along a tall flowering stem. The dorsal sepal and petals overlap to form a hood over the column. The labellum has a spur and usually three lobes which may be short or long and threadlike. The distinguishing feature of the genus is the presence of two club-shaped projections on the stigma.

Taxonomy and naming
The genus Habenaria was first formally described in 1805 by Carl Ludwig Willdenow and the description was published in Species Plantarum. The generic name is derived from the Latin word habena meaning "thong", "strap" or "rein".

See also
 List of Habenaria species

Distribution and habitat
Rein orchids are distributed in tropical and subtropical regions and with centres of diversity in Africa and Brazil. Seventeen species are known in Australia.

References

External links
 
 

 
Orchideae genera